Vanavasi is a Town Panchayat in Mettur Taluka, Salem District, in the Indian state of Tamil Nadu.

Culture 
Several festivals are celebrated in Vanavasi, including the Draupathiyamman Festival (celebrated Five years once), the festival of Sowdeswari Amman (celebrated every five years), and the Mariyamman Festival (held annually during the Tamil month Aippasi).

Economy
Vanavasi is a Town Panchayat (selection level) made popular by its temples and its hand loom silk sarees. Its best known temples are in the Salem District. Power looms, which are involved in synthetic saree manufacturing, are also widely used. A weekly market is organized every Thursday. Coconut trees and mango trees are abundant, and the town supports lush vegetation. Agriculture is the second main occupation in yjhr town.Koppukondraya Mountain can be seen from the town itself, and a Perumal temple is located on the mountain. People of vanavasi often travel to the mountain during festival days. ICIC bank has a branch in vanavasi near girls higher secondary school.

The major occupations of Vanavasi are silk sari weaving and powerloom fabrics .It is the traditional centre of handloom silk industries producing pure silk sarees.  Most of the people are manufacturing handmade silk sarees and exporting the sarees to various out stations in India and other countries.

Education
There are two government-run schools in Vanavasi. One is a public elementary school, the other is the Government Higher Secondary School. Additionally, there are two private matriculation schools, the Sakthi Matriculation School and Isha Vidhya Matriculation School. The town also has its own local library.

Transportation

Salem, 36 km (22.3 mi.) away, is the nearest major city to Vanavasi, and is well-connected to public and private bus services. Mettur is the popular town 20 km away Salem also has the nearest major railway junction from which metropolitan cities Bengaluru and Chennai are few hours away. There is an airport at Kaamalapuram (salem), which is a 35-minute drive from the city. It is located by the Salem-Bangalore Highway (via National Highway 7 or NH-7). In November 2009, Kingfisher Airlines launched ATR-72 daily service flight to Chennai. Salem Airport is connected by Kingfisher Airlines from Chennai. The other near major airports are at Trichy (162 km, or 100.6 mi. away) and Coimbatore (165 km, or 102.5 mi. away).

Mettur, 20 km away, the popular town is also nearest to vanavasi, makes easy conveyances to major towns of Erode district. Mettur is at the border for Karnataka State and Male Mahadeshwara Hills is a pilgrimage, located 40 kilometers (25 mi) from Mettur. From there it is also possible to reach Mysore.

Adjacent communities
Mettur, 19.8 km (13.03 mi.) away.

Tharamangalam, 11 km (6.8 mi.) away.

Jalakandapuram, 6 km (3.7 mi.) away.

Salem, 36 km (22.3 mi.) away.

Nangavalli, 1 km (0.62 mi.) away.

Photos

References

Notes

Cities and towns in Salem district